Walter Kaiser (born 29 April 1971) is an Austrian rower. He competed in the men's quadruple sculls event at the 1992 Summer Olympics.

References

1971 births
Living people
Austrian male rowers
Olympic rowers of Austria
Rowers at the 1992 Summer Olympics
Sportspeople from Klagenfurt